The 2006–07 Honduran Liga Nacional de Ascenso was the 40th season of the Second level in Honduran football and the fifth under the name Liga Nacional de Ascenso.  Under the management of Carlos Martínez, Deportes Savio won the tournament after defeating Arsenal F.C. in the promotion series and obtained promotion to the 2007–08 Honduran Liga Nacional.

Promotion

 Deportes Savio won 1–0 on aggregate.

References

Ascenso
2006